Danzao Town is a town in Nanhai District, Foshan, Guangdong, China.

External links

Nanhai District
Towns in Guangdong